Andrzej Januszajtis (born 18 August 1928) is a Polish physicist, professor and politician who served as the Chairman of the City Council of Gdańsk from 1991 to 1994.

References 

1928 births
Living people
People from Lida
People from Nowogródek Voivodeship (1919–1939)
Mayors of Gdańsk
20th-century Polish politicians
20th-century Polish physicists
Gdańsk University of Technology alumni